Lennox may refer to:

Places
 Lennox, Nova Scotia, Canada
 Lennox County, Ontario, Canada
 Lennox (electoral district), a former electoral district in Ontario (1867–1904)
 The Lennox, a region of Scotland
 Lennox (district), Scotland
 Lennox, California, United States
 Lennox, South Dakota, United States
 Lennox, Wisconsin, United States

People and fictional characters
 Lennox (surname), a list of people and fictional characters surnamed Lennox or Lenox
 Lennox (given name), a list of people and fictional characters named Lennox or Lenox

Titles
 Duke of Lennox
 Earl of Lennox
 Thane of Lennox, a subsidiary title of Earl of Perth

Other uses
 HMS Lennox, two ships of the Royal Navy
 Lennox Football Club, 19th-century English rugby club
 Lennox Generating Station, a power station in Ontario, Canada
 Lennox International, a global manufacturer of furnaces and central air conditioners
 Lennox Stakes, a horse race

See also
 Lennox-Gastaut syndrome, a difficult-to-treat form of childhood-onset epilepsy
 Lennox and Addington, an electoral district in Ontario, Canada
 Zion & Lennox, a reggaeton music duo from Carolina, Puerto Rico
 Lenox (disambiguation)
 Linux, an open-source Unix-like operating-system kernel